The 2022 Ireland women's Tri-Nation Series was a cricket tournament that took place in Ireland in July 2022. It was a tri-nation series between Australia women, Ireland women and the Pakistan women cricket teams, with the matches played as Women's Twenty20 International (WT20I) fixtures. Australia and Pakistan used the series as preparation for the cricket tournament at the 2022 Commonwealth Games in Birmingham, England.

The opening match, between Australia and Pakistan, was initially delayed due to rain and reduced to 19 overs per side. Pakistan were reduced to 56/6, with Alana King taking three wickets in one over, before the rain returned and the match ended in a no result. The second WT20I was between the hosts Ireland and Australia. Australia won by nine wickets, inside 13 overs, with Alana King once again taking three wickets in the match. Ireland played Pakistan in the third match, which was also shortened due to rain. Pakistan went on to win by 13 runs, after Ireland failed to chase a revised target of 97 runs.

Ireland played Australia in the fourth match of the series, with Australia winning by 63 runs. Megan Schutt took her 100th wicket in WT20I cricket, with Tahlia McGrath being named player of the match for the fourth consecutive match she has batted in. Australia and Pakistan played each other in the fifth match, with their fixture again being washed out, after Jess Jonassen had taken 4/17 to restrict Pakstian to 94/8. If four more balls had been bowled, then Australia would have won under the Duckworth–Lewis–Stern method. The sixth and final match, between Ireland and Australia, was washed out with no play being possible. Therefore Australia won the tournament with Alana King being named as the player of the series.

Squads

Ghulam Fatima, Sadaf Shamas and Umm-e-Hani were also named as reserve players in Pakistan's squad. Australia's Jess Jonassen was ruled out of the start of the series after testing positive for COVID-19. As a result, Heather Graham was added to their squad as cover. Prior to the series, Shauna Kavanagh withdrew herself from Ireland's squad due to personal reasons, with Mary Waldron named as her replacement.

Points table

WT20I series

1st WT20I

2nd WT20I

3rd WT20I

4th WT20I

5th WT20I

6th WT20I

Notes

References

External links
 Series home at ESPN Cricinfo

2022 in Australian cricket
2022 in Irish cricket
2022 in Pakistani cricket
2022 in women's cricket
International cricket competitions in 2022
International women's cricket competitions in Ireland
Women's Twenty20 cricket international competitions
Ireland women's Tri-Nation Series